Cameron Suafoa (born 23 April 1998 in New Zealand) is a New Zealand rugby union player who plays for North Harbour in the National Provincial Championship. His playing position is flanker. He is currently contracted to the Blues Super Rugby Franchise and made us debut on 29th March 2022 at Mount Smart Stadium. Cameron was named in the 2022 Māori All Black’s squad to play a 2-test series against Ireland. He made his debut for the Māori All Blacks on June 29th at FMG stadium in Hamilton.

Reference list

External links
itsrugby.co.uk profile

1998 births
New Zealand rugby union players
Living people
Rugby union flankers
Tasman rugby union players
Rugby union locks
Auckland rugby union players
North Harbour rugby union players
Blues (Super Rugby) players